"Right in the Wrong Direction" is a song co-written and recorded by American country music artist Vern Gosdin.  It was released in February 1990 as the third single from the album Alone.  The song reached #10 on the Billboard Hot Country Singles & Tracks chart.  Gosdin wrote the song with Hank Cochran and Mack Vickery.

Chart performance

Year-end charts

References

1990 singles
Vern Gosdin songs
Songs written by Hank Cochran
Songs written by Mack Vickery
Songs written by Vern Gosdin
Song recordings produced by Bob Montgomery (songwriter)
Columbia Records singles
1989 songs